Wang Zhenglin (born 21 October 1912, date of death unknown) was a Chinese long-distance runner. He competed in the marathon at the 1936 Summer Olympics.

References

1912 births
Year of death missing
Athletes (track and field) at the 1936 Summer Olympics
Chinese male long-distance runners
Chinese male marathon runners
Olympic athletes of China
Place of birth missing